Alex Goodman is a Canadian jazz guitarist currently residing in New York City.

Biography

A native of Toronto, Canada, Goodman initially attended McGill University as a political science major.  He later opted to return to Toronto to study music at the University of Toronto before relocating to New York City to complete a Master's degree at Manhattan School of Music.

In 2013, Goodman received a nomination for Canada's Juno Award for Contemporary Jazz Album of the Year. The album, Bridges, featured original music by Goodman as well as arrangements of compositions by Béla Bartók and Frédéric Chopin. He also received the 2013 ASCAP Herb Alpert Jazz Composer Award.

In July 2014, Goodman became the first Canadian to win both first prize and the Public's Choice Award at the prestigious SOCAR Montreux International Jazz Guitar Competition.

He has worked with artists including John Patitucci, Manuel Valera, Ari Hoenig, Tim Ries, Dick Oatts, John Riley, Jimmy MacBride, Rich Perry, Dan Tepfer and others.

As a bandleader, he has released seven albums, including Impressions in Blue and Red (2020), Second Act (2017), Border Crossing (2016), Etudes for Solo Guitar (2014), Bridges (2011), Convergence (2009) and Roots (2007).

Discography

As leader
 Roots (Independent, 2007)
 Convergence (Independent, 2009)
 Bridges (Connection Point Records, 2011)
 Etudes for Solo Guitar (Independent, 2014)
 Border Crossing (Origin Records, 2016)
 Second Act (Lyte Records, 2017)
 Impressions in Blue and Red (Outside In, 2020)

As sideman
With Manuel Valera

2022 Distancia
 2020 José Martí en Nueva York

With Mareike Wiening
 2022 Future Memories
 2021 Live at Bird's Eye
 2019 Metropolis Paradise
 2015 Crosswalk

With Remy Le Boeuf 
 2021 Architecture of Storms
 2019 Assembly of Shadows
With Amanda Tosoff
 2021 Earth Voices 
 2016 Words
With Ernesto Cervini
 2021 Tetrahedron Live at the Jazz Room 

With Leo Sherman
 2019  Tonewheel 
With Andrew Van Tassel
 2021 Shapeshifter

With Allegra Levy 
 2018 Looking at the Moon

With Tomoko Omura
 2017  Post Bop Gypsies 
With Chad Lefkowitz Brown
 2020  Quarantine Sessions

With Matthew Sheens 
 2016 Cloud Appreciation Day

With Garry Dial & Dick Oatts
 2014 That Music Always Round Me

With San Fermin
 2014 San Fermin

References

External links
 

Living people
Canadian classical guitarists
Canadian jazz guitarists
1987 births
Canadian male jazz musicians